Senator Kahele may refer to:

Gil Kahele (1942–2016), Hawaii State Senate
Kai Kahele (born 1974), Hawaii State Senate